Pavlov's Dog is classical conditioning, originally experiments using dogs by the Russian physiologist Ivan Pavlov. In 1904, Pavlov was awarded the Nobel Prize for his physiology work. 

Pavlov's Dog may also refer to:

 Pavlov's Dog (band), an American band
 "Pavlov's Dogs", a song by Rorschach